
Year 373 (CCCLXXIII) was a common year starting on Tuesday (link will display the full calendar) of the Julian calendar. At the time, it was known as the Year of the Consulship of Augustus and Valens (or, less frequently, year 1126 Ab urbe condita). The denomination 373 for this year has been used since the early medieval period, when the Anno Domini calendar era became the prevalent method in Europe for naming years.

Events 
 By place 
 Roman Empire 
 Emperor Valens is converted to Arianism, and orders the persecution of Trinitarian Christians in the Roman East. 
 Quintus Aurelius Symmachus becomes proconsul of Africa, and is made a member of the pontifical college.
 Count Theodosius is appointed commander of an expedition to suppress the rebellion of Firmus in Mauretania.
 Valens Aqueduct is inaugurated near Constantinople (modern Istanbul); the aqueduct has a length of 971 meters.

 Europe 
 Battle of the Tanais River: The Huns defeat the Alans near the Don, sending the remnants fleeing westward. 

 Persia 
 King Shapur II declares war as a result of Valens' support of Armenia. Emperor Valens makes Antioch his military base for the campaign against Persia.

 By topic 
 Religion 
 Saint Martin of Tours undertakes the Christianization of Gaul.

Births 
 Murong Hui, Chinese general and prince of the Later Yan Dynasty (d. 397)
 Murong Sheng (or Daoyun), Chinese emperor of the Later Yan Dynasty (d. 401)
 Synesius of Cyrene, Christian bishop (approximate date)

Deaths 

 May 2 – Athanasius of Alexandria, Egyptian Coptic Orthodox bishop (b. 296)
 June 9 – Ephrem the Syrian, Syrian Orthodox priest and saint (b. 306)
 Huan Wen (or Yuanzi), Chinese general and regent (b. 312)
 Nerses I (the Great), Armenian catholicos (or patriarch)
 Sun Sheng, Chinese historian and politician (b. 302)

References